Saradha Koirala (born 19 July 1980) is a New Zealand poet and writer based in Melbourne, Australia. She is the author of three poetry collections and two Young Adult novels. Koirala also writes literature reviews and has interviewed international authors and covered events such as the Auckland Writers & Readers Festival. She was the convening judge for the Mary and Peter Biggs Award for Poetry in the 2022 Ockham New Zealand Book Awards.

Background
Koirala was born York, England to a New Zealand mother and Nepali father. She grew up in Nelson, New Zealand and was educated at Otago University receiving a Bachelor of Arts in English and later qualified as a secondary school teacher with a Graduate Diploma in Teaching from Victoria University of Wellington. 
In 2007, Koirala completed the highly regarded Master of Creative Writing at Victoria's International Institute of Modern Letters under visiting tutor Dora Malech. Koirala is also a member of the New Zealand Society of Authors and the Academy of New Zealand Literature.

Publications
Wit of the Staircase (poetry) Steele Roberts Aotearoa, 2009 
Tear Water Tea (poetry) Steele Roberts Aotearoa, 2013 
Lonesome When You Go (YA fiction) Mākaro Press, 2016 
 Photos of the Sky (poetry) The Cuba Press, 2018 
Learning to love Blue (YA fiction) Record Press, 2021

Awards
Lonesome When You Go received a Storylines Notable Book Award, 2017

Learning to love Blue won the Young Adult Fiction Award in the 2022 New Zealand Book Awards for Children and Young Adults

References

External links
Saradha Koirala's website
Radio New Zealand interview with Koirala
Landfall review of Tear Water Tea
Takahe Review of Tear Water Tea
Review of Learning to love Blue

New Zealand poets
New Zealand women poets
University of Otago alumni
1980 births
Living people
International Institute of Modern Letters alumni